Making Music Lah-Lah's Way is the second album from Australian children's band Lah-Lah. It was released independently coinciding with Lah-Lah's  live season at the Sydney Opera House Concert Hall in Sydney in June 2011.

Track listing

"Boom Chaka Baby" (M & T Harris)
"Making Music Lah-Lah's Way" (M & T Harris)
"Hey Hey Everybody" (M & T Harris)
"Choo Choo Kettle" (M & T Harris)
"When Buzz Gets Up In The Morning" (M & T Harris)
"Tinkering" (M & T Harris)
"Music Makes Me Feel So Good" (M & T Harris)
"Brand New Day" (M & T Harris)
"Woody The Woodwind" (M & T Harris)
"Cinderella Samba" (M & T Harris)
"I Like To Wash My Hands" (M & T Harris)
"Buzz Writing Song" (M & T Harris)
"Big Bold and Brassy" (M & T Harris)
"Rain Go Away" (M & T Harris)
"Little Bee Lullaby" (M & T Harris)
"Dancing Doll" (M & T Harris)
"We're a Family" (M & T Harris)
"Look Out Backyard Here I Come" (M & T Harris)
"Pack Away" (M & T Harris)
"Goodbye" (M & T Harris)

Personnel
Tina Harris (Lah-Lah) - vocals
Mark Harris (Buzz) - vocals/double bass
Nic Cecire (Tom Tom) - drums/percussion
Gary Daley (Squeezy Sneezy) - accordion/piano/keyboards
Matt Ottignon (Mister Saxophone) - tenor sax/soprano sax/clarinet/flute
Simon Sweeney (special guest) - trumpet
Anthony Kable (special guest) - trombone
Lilian Harris (special guest) - vocals

References

External links 
 Lah-Lah site

2011 albums
Children's music albums